Viscount Hewart, of Bury in the County Palatine of Lancaster, was a title in the Peerage of the United Kingdom. It was created in 1940 for Gordon Hewart, 1st Baron Hewart, on his retirement as Lord Chief Justice. He had already been created Baron Hewart, of Bury in the County of Lancaster, in 1922, also in the Peerage of the United Kingdom. He was educated at Bury Grammar School. The titles became extinct on the death of his son, the second Viscount, in 1964.

Viscounts Hewart (1940)
Gordon Hewart, 1st Viscount Hewart (1870–1943)
Hugh Vaughan Hewart, 2nd Viscount Hewart (1896–1964)

References

Extinct viscountcies in the Peerage of the United Kingdom
Noble titles created in 1940
Noble titles created for UK MPs